Robert Watson Landry (June 22, 1922November 13, 2017) was an American lawyer, judge, and  Democratic politician.  He served two terms in the Wisconsin State Assembly, representing the east side of the city of Milwaukee and went on to serve 35 years as a Wisconsin circuit court judge in Milwaukee County.

Biography
Landry was born in Madison, Wisconsin. He attended school in Atwater, Wisconsin, and Shorewood, Wisconsin, before graduating from the University of Chicago and the University of Wisconsin Law School. During World War II, Landry served in the United States Navy. He died on November 13, 2017, at the age of 95.

Political career
Landry was elected on the Democratic ticket to the Wisconsin State Assembly in 1950, representing Milwaukee County's 1st Assembly district (the 1st and 3rd wards of the city of Milwaukee).  He was re-elected in 1952.

During his second term in the Assembly, he ran for and won election to a judgeship on the Milwaukee Civil Court.  He served in that role until he was appointed to the Wisconsin circuit court judgeship in November 1959, to replace Francis X. Swietlik, who had resigned. He subsequently served 35 years as a circuit court judge.  In 1977 he ran for an open seat on the Wisconsin Supreme Court, but was defeated by William G. Callow.

Electoral history

Wisconsin Supreme Court (1977)

| colspan="6" style="text-align:center;background-color: #e9e9e9;"| Nonpartisan Primary, February 15, 1977 (top-two)

| colspan="6" style="text-align:center;background-color: #e9e9e9;"| General Election, April 5, 1977

References

|-

1922 births
2017 deaths
United States Navy personnel of World War II
Democratic Party members of the Wisconsin State Assembly
Military personnel from Madison, Wisconsin
People from Shorewood, Wisconsin
Politicians from Madison, Wisconsin
United States Navy sailors
University of Chicago alumni
University of Wisconsin Law School alumni
Wisconsin lawyers
20th-century American lawyers